County House Mountain is a mountain in Warren County, New Jersey. County House Mountain is separated from Oxford Mountain to the southwest at Sykes Gap, and is itself bifurcated at Stewart Gap; it forms a part of the divide between Pohatcong Creek and the Pequest River. It is part of the New York–New Jersey Highlands of the Appalachian Mountains.

References 

Mountains of Warren County, New Jersey
Mountains of New Jersey